Su Marine Yachts is a Turkish shipbuilding and Boat building company based in Istanbul.

Su Marine builds luxury sailing and motor yachts.

History
SU MARINE Ship Yard company was incorporated in 2007. SU MARINE’s roots date more than 40 years ago, and was known as well for being the first composite boat builder in Turkey.

The ShipYard
SU MARINE Yard is located in Tuzla, Istanbul next to the Sabiha Gökçen International Airport on the coast of the Marmara Sea.
SU MARINE has a  facility including four large yachts building areas,  administrative and engineering office space,  interior joinery workshop,  stainless steel workshop,  wharehouse space including special area for sensitive items and  paint facility.

Areas of Expertise
SU MARINE masterises different building techniques including cold molded wood epoxy, composite, steel and aluminium.

SU MARINE Super Luxury Sailing Yachts Launches and Reviews

ROXANE is a cold molded wood epoxy ketch with a total 153.7 feet length overall.

ILIOS is a cold molded wood epoxy ketch with a total overall length of 90 feet designed by Tanju Kalaycıoğlu.

See also
 List of large sailing yachts
 List of shipbuilders and shipyards
 List of boat builders

References

External links
 Company Details
 Official homepage
 Roxane Sailing Yacht Finalist for the World Superyacht Award 2011
 SuperYacht of the Week: Roxane
 Elite Yacht
 Outrageous Luxury
 Most talked About Charter Yachts
 Super Yacht Times : Su Marine launches 40m Sailing Yacht ZELDA
 Superyatchts.com: Su Marine Yacht Builder

Shipbuilding companies
Manufacturing companies based in Istanbul
Manufacturing companies established in 2007
Turkish brands
Turkish companies established in 2007